

Alfred Bruer (4 November 1897 – 12 February 1976) was an officer in the Wehrmacht of Nazi Germany during World War II who briefly commanded the 21st Panzer Division.  He was a recipient of the Knight's Cross of the Iron Cross. Bruer surrendered to the Allied troops following the fall of Tunisia in 1943.

Awards and decorations

 Knight's Cross of the Iron Cross on 30 July 1942 as Oberst and commander of Panzer-Artillerie-Regiment 155

References

Citations

Bibliography

 

1897 births
1976 deaths
People from Schwäbisch Gmünd
German Army personnel of World War I
Recipients of the clasp to the Iron Cross, 1st class
Recipients of the Knight's Cross of the Iron Cross
Recipients of the Silver Medal of Military Valor
German prisoners of war in World War II held by the United Kingdom
People from the Kingdom of Württemberg
Military personnel from Baden-Württemberg